A Village étape (France) or a Village relais (Québec) is a small town, typically under five thousand people, designated to provide a complete set of services for national or provincial highway travellers. While most do provide natural or cultural landmarks, activities or attractions in some form, the core requirements address quality or hours of operation for amenities such as restaurants, grocers, lodging and tourist information.

Village étape
In France, a village étape is a village standing or just off a motorway or national dual-carriageway that has been accepted by the "Village étape" Association as meeting the following criteria:

 Population under 5000
 A range of "basic" shops (butcher, baker, newsagent, grocer)
 A range of varied eating places
 A classified hotel
 A Tourist Information Point or Centre
 A shaded parking area
 A telephone
 A picnic area
 Public toilets
 A Cash machine

The shopkeepers, hoteliers or restaurant keepers involved in the Village étape movement have all have to sign the Villages étapes quality charter.

They can be easily identifiable by the "Philémon the hedgehog"  sticker displayed in their windows.

Village relais
The corresponding status in Québec is village relais. Québec's programme is based on the original French "village étape"; its criteria, as defined by the provincial transport ministry (MTQ), are similar but not identical. 

A village-relais may appear en route along any numbered Québec highway (not just a limited access "autoroute") but must offer at least the following:
 Restaurant
 Fuel, auto repair and towing
 Lodging
 Grocer, cash machine, toilets, public telephone
 Parking
 RV dump station, tourist info and wi-fi

Minimum hours of operation for each service are specified for each of high season and off-season travel.

Current villages-étapes
2014
 Aumont-Aubrac - Lozère - A75 exit 35/36
 Bédée - Ille-et-Vilaine - RN12
 Bellac - Haute-Vienne - RN147
 Bessines-sur-Gartempe - Haute-Vienne - A20 exit 24
 Brens - Tarn - A68 exit 9
 Charolles - Saône et Loire - RN79 exit 12
 Dol-de-Bretagne - Ille-et-Vilaine - RN176
 Dompierre-sur-Besbre - Allier - RN79
 Donzenac - Corrèze - A20 exit 47/48
 Ducey - Manche - A84 exit 33
 Eguzon - Indre - A20 exit 20
 Elven - Morbihan - RN166
 Florac - Lozère - RN106
 Gouzon - Creuse - RN145
 Grand-Fougeray - Ille-et-Vilaine - N137
 Joinville - Haute-Marne - RN67
 Josselin - Morbihan - RN24
 La Canourgue - Corrèze - A75 exit 40
 La Rochefoucauld - Charente - RN145
 La Souterraine - Creuse - RN145
 Lapalisse - Allier - RN7
 Launois-sur-Vence - Ardennes - A34 exit 13/14
 Le Caylar - Hérault - A75 exit 49
 Ligny-en-Barrois - Meuse - RN4
 Magnac-Bourg - Haute-Vienne - A20 exit 41
 Massiac - Cantal - A75 exit 23/24
 Montmarault - Allier - RN79
 Pierre-Buffière - Haute-Vienne - A20 exit 40
 Plélan-le-Grand - Ille-et-Vilaine - RN24
 Plombières-les-Bains - Vosges - RN57
 Pougues-les-Eaux - Nièvre - A77 exit 31/32
 Rocroi - Ardennes - RN51
 Saint-Brice-en-Coglès - Ille-et-Vilaine - A84 exit 31
 Saint-Thégonnec - Finistère - RN12
 Torigni-sur-Vire - Manche - A84 exit 40
 Tourouvre - Orne - RN12
 Uzerche - Corrèze - A20 exit 44/45
 Vatan - Indre - A20 exit 10a/10b
 Villedieu-les-Poêles - Manche - A84 exit 37/38
 Villers-Bocage - Calvados - A84 exit 43/44
 Vivonne - Vienne - RN10
 Vouillé - Vienne - RN149

Current villages-relais
August 2014:
 Abitibi-Témiscamingue: Duhamel-Ouest, La Sarre, Témiscaming. 
 Bas-Saint-Laurent: Amqui, Dégelis, La Pocatière, Mont-Joli. 
 Capitale: Baie-Saint-Paul, Deschambault-Grondines, Saint-Siméon. 
 Chaudières-Appalaches: La Guadeloupe. 
 Côte-Nord: Les Escoumins, Forestville, Rivière-au-Tonnerre, Sacré-Coeur-sur-le-Fjord-du-Saguenay. 
 Est-de-la-Montérégie: Acton Vale. 
 Estrie: Danville, Stanstead, Stornoway, Weedon. 
 Gaspé: Cap-Chat, Chandler, Grande-Vallée, Murdochville, Paspébiac, Pointe-à-la-Croix, Rivière-au-Renard, Saint-Maxime-du-Mont-Louis.
 Laurentides–Lanaudière: Berthierville, Labelle, Rivière-Rouge (Sainte-Véronique). 
 Mauricie - Centre du Québec: Nicolet, Yamachiche. 
 Outaouais: Maniwaki, Montebello. 
 Nord-du-Québec: Chapais, Chibougamau, Matagami. 
 Saguenay–Lac-Saint-Jean: La Doré, L'Anse-Saint-Jean, Hébertville, Saint-Fulgence.

References

External link

Geography of France
Geography of Quebec
Communities